Diego Cattani (born 9 September 1971) is an Italian short track speed skater. He competed in the men's 5000 metre relay event at the 1998 Winter Olympics.

References

1971 births
Living people
Italian male short track speed skaters
Olympic short track speed skaters of Italy
Short track speed skaters at the 1998 Winter Olympics
Sportspeople from Milan